SS George R. Poole was a Liberty ship built in the United States during World War II.

Construction
George R. Poole was laid down on 7 December 1944, under a Maritime Commission (MARCOM) contract, MC hull 2395, by J.A. Jones Construction, Brunswick, Georgia; she was sponsored by Mrs .R.D. Strauchan, and launched on 8 January 1945.

History
She was allocated to the Stockard Steamship Corp., on 19 January 1945. On 7 January 1946, she was laid up in the National Defense Reserve Fleet, in the James River Group, Lee Hall, Virginia. On 13 December 1957, she was sold for $88,668, to Boston Metals Co., for scrapping. She was removed from the fleet on 25 February 1958.

References

Bibliography

 
 
 
 
 

 

Liberty ships
Ships built in Brunswick, Georgia
1945 ships
Wilmington Reserve Fleet